The 2014 Philippine Basketball Association (PBA) Governors' Cup Finals was the best-of-5 championship series of the 2014 PBA Governors' Cup, and the conclusion of the conference's playoffs. The San Mig Super Coffee Mixers and the Rain or Shine Elasto Painters competed for the 14th Governors' Cup championship and the 112th overall championship contested by the league.

The Coffee Mixers became the fourth team in the league's history, and the first one since 1996, to win all of the conference titles in a season, also known as the Grand Slam, after defeating the Elasto Painters, three games to two. They also won their fourth straight PBA title, which was last done by the Alaska Milkmen (who also won the latest Grand Slam) from 1995 to 1996.

Background

San Mig Super Coffee Mixers
San Mig Super Coffee finished the elimination round with a 5–4 record and tied with Alaska, San Miguel, Barangay Ginebra and Air21 in third place. Due to the quotient system imposed for tiebreakers this conference, the Coffee Mixers ended up in fourth place, having the second superior quotient among the five teams. The team then defeated fifth seeded San Miguel Beermen in the quarterfinals in one game (SMC has a twice to beat advantage), 97–90. San Mig Coffee advanced to the semifinal round and was matched up against their Commissioner's Cup finals opponent, the Talk 'N Text Tropang Texters. San Mig Coffee was able to win the first two games of their best-of-five series, giving them an edge to close out the series and sweep out Talk 'N Text. However, the Tropang Texters were able to win games 3 and 4, forcing a deciding Game 5. The rubber match was very close and no team led their opponent by more than six points in the first three quarters. In the fourth quarter, the free throw shooting woes and missed attempts in the painted area of Talk 'N Text became costly as San Mig Coffee was able to break away with the lead and the win to clinch the first finals berth.

Rain or Shine Elasto Painters
The Elasto Painters struggled in the earlier part of the tournament, ending up with a 1–3 record in their first four games. They won all of their remaining games, including a 51-point win against Alaska last June 4. After the eliminations, they ended up with the second seed going to the quarterfinals and was pitted against the Air21. They took advantage of their twice-to-win incentive and defeated the Express in one game, 111–90. In the semifinals, they went up against Alaska. Both teams had alternating wins in the series, with Alaska winning games one and three, while the Elasto Painters won games two and four. Rain or Shine eventually won the deciding game five of their series, and set a rematch against San Mig Coffee.

Road to the finals

Head-to-head matchup

Series summary
*overtime

Game 1

At the first three quarters, Rain or Shine got the lead many times, even up to seventeen, but the Coffee Mixers bounced back and won this game, 101–104, led by PJ Simon's 18 points.

Game 2

Game 3

Game 4

Game 5

Rosters

{| class="toccolours" style="font-size: 95%; width: 100%;"
|-
! colspan="2" style="background-color: #; color: #; text-align: center;" | San Mig Super Coffee Mixers 2014 Governors' Cup roster
|- style="background-color:#; color: #; text-align: center;"
! Players !! Coaches
|-
| valign="top" |
{| class="sortable" style="background:transparent; margin:0px; width:100%;"
! Pos. !! # !! POB !! Name !! Height !! Weight !! !! College 
|-
   

                                      
           

  

 

{| class="toccolours" style="font-size: 95%; width: 100%;"
|-
! colspan="2" style="background-color: #; color: #; text-align: center;" | Rain or Shine Elasto Painters 2014 Governors' Cup roster
|- style="background-color:#; color: #; text-align: center;"
! Players !! Coaches
|-
| valign="top" |
{| class="sortable" style="background:transparent; margin:0px; width:100%;"
! Pos. !! # !! POB !! Name !! Height !! Weight !! !! College 
|-

Broadcast notes

Additional Game 5 crew:
Trophy presentation: Nikko Ramos
Dugout interviewer: Nikko Ramos

References

External links
PBA official website

2014
2013–14 PBA season
Rain or Shine Elasto Painters games
Magnolia Hotshots games
PBA Governors' Cup Finals